Don't Tread on Me is a political slogan dating to the American Revolution. It may also refer to:

Latin
 An alternative English translation to the Latin phrase, noli me tangere

Music 
 Don't Tread on Me (album), a 2005 alternative rock album by 311
 "Don't Tread on Me" (311 song), eponymous song from the album
 "Don't Tread on Me" (Metallica song), a 1991 heavy metal song by Metallica
 "Don't Tread on Me" (We the Kingdom song), 2021
 "The Reckoning" (Iced Earth song), a 2003 power metal song by Iced Earth
 A 1960s protopunk song by Kit and the Outlaws
 A 1986 hardcore punk song by Cro-Mags on The Age of Quarrel
 A 1992 hard rock song by Damn Yankees on Don't Tread

Flags 
 Gadsden flag, with a yellow field and coiled rattlesnake
 First Navy Jack, with a striped field of red and white
 South Carolina Navy jack, with a striped field of red and blue
 A flag with a white field used by the Culpeper Minutemen
 A flag with a yellow field and a porcupine used by the Free State Project

Other uses 
 A chapter in John Adams, a 2008 TV miniseries

See also
 An Appeal to Heaven
 Come and Take It
 Liberté, égalité, fraternité